In fluid dynamics, the Morton number (Mo) is a dimensionless number used together with the Eötvös number or Bond number to characterize the shape of bubbles or drops moving in a surrounding fluid or continuous phase, c.
It is named after Rose Morton, who described it with W. L. Haberman in 1953.

Definition
The Morton number is defined as

 

For the case of a bubble with a negligible inner density the Morton number can be simplified to

Relation to other parameters
The Morton number can also be expressed by using a combination of the Weber number, Froude number and Reynolds number,

The Froude number in the above expression is defined as

where V is a reference velocity and d is the equivalent diameter of the drop or bubble.

References

Dimensionless numbers
Bubbles (physics)
Dimensionless numbers of fluid mechanics
Fluid dynamics